Burcombe Down is an area of chalk grassland situated on a north-facing scarp slope to the south of Burcombe in Wiltshire, England.

Sources

 Natural England citation sheet for the site (accessed 22 March 2022)

External links
 Natural England website (SSSI information)

Sites of Special Scientific Interest in Wiltshire
Sites of Special Scientific Interest notified in 1971
Hills of Wiltshire